Peter Hills (born 3 December 1958) is a New Zealand former cricketer. He played 34 first-class and 28 List A matches for Otago between 1978 and 1990.

See also
 List of Otago representative cricketers

References

External links
 

1958 births
Living people
New Zealand cricketers
Otago cricketers
People from Ranfurly, New Zealand